The 1983 NCAA Women's Soccer Tournament was the second annual single-elimination tournament to determine the national champion of NCAA women's collegiate soccer. The championship game was again played at the University of Central Florida in Orlando, Florida during December 1983. 

North Carolina defeated George Mason in the final, 4–0, to win their second national title. The Tar Heels were coached by Anson Dorrance.

The most outstanding player was Chris Taggert (Massachusetts), the most outstanding offensive player was  Lisa Gmitter (George Mason), and the most outstanding defensive player was Sue Cobb (North Carolina). Additionally, a All-Tournament team, consisting of 16 players, was named for the first time this year. 

The leading scorer for the tournament was April Heinrichs from North Carolina (4 goals).

Qualification
At the time, there was only one NCAA championship for women's soccer; a Division III title was added in 1986 and a Division II title in 1988. Hence, all NCAA women's soccer programs  (whether from Division I, Division II, or Division III) were eligible for this championship. A total of 12 teams were ultimately invited to contest this tournament.

Bracket

See also 
 NCAA Division I women's soccer championship
 1983 NCAA Division I men's soccer championship

References

NCAA
NCAA Women's Soccer Championship
 
NCAA Women's Soccer Tournament